Thaumastochloa is a genus of Australian, Papuasian, and Indonesian plants in the grass family.

 Species

 formerly included
see Mnesithea 
 Thaumastochloa chenii  - Mnesithea laevis var. chenii  
 Thaumastochloa cochinchinensis - Mnesithea laevis var. cochinchinensis  
 Thaumastochloa cochinchinensis f. shimadana - Mnesithea laevis var. chenii  
 Thaumastochloa shimadana - Mnesithea laevis var. chenii

References

Andropogoneae
Poaceae genera
Taxa named by Charles Edward Hubbard